Benjamin Grubb Humphreys II (August 17, 1865 – October 16, 1923) was a U.S. Representative from Mississippi. He was known by his constituents as "Our Ben."

Early life
Benjamin Grubb Humphreys II was born on August 17, 1865, in Claiborne County, Mississippi. His father was Benjamin G. Humphreys.

Humphreys attended the public schools at Lexington, Mississippi, and the University of Mississippi at Oxford where he studied law. He was admitted to the bar in 1891 and commenced practice in Greenwood, Mississippi.

Career
Humphreys served as the superintendent of education for Leflore County 1892–1896. He served as district attorney for the fourth district of Mississippi 1895–1903. He raised a company in April 1898 for service in the Spanish–American War and was its first lieutenant, serving under Maj. Gen. Fitzhugh Lee in Florida during the entire war.

Humphreys was elected as a Democrat to the Fifty-eighth and to the ten succeeding Congresses and served from March 4, 1903, until his death. He served as chairman of the Committee on Territories (Sixty-second Congress), Committee on Flood Control (Sixty-fourth and Sixty-fifth Congresses). He served as delegate to the Democratic National Convention in 1920.

Death
Humphreys died in Greenville, Mississippi, October 16, 1923. He was interred in Greenville Cemetery.

See also
List of United States Congress members who died in office (1900–49)

References

Bibliography

External links
 

1865 births
1923 deaths
People from Claiborne County, Mississippi
American people of Welsh descent
Democratic Party members of the United States House of Representatives from Mississippi
United States Army officers